Praveena Solomon is a crematorium manager of Chennai’s oldest and busiest cremation ground.

Praveena started caretaking the Velankadu crematorium two and a half years ago as part of her attachment with an NGO.

Education 
Praveena is an English literature graduate from the University of Madras. She has also studied Nursing. Praveena was introduced to social work by her mother, who worked closely with social worker Sarojini Varadappan.

Career 
She joined the NGO named Indian Community Welfare Organisation in 2004 working as a field officer and was educating underprivileged children and sex workers. For Solomon, handling the crematorium is another service.

In March 2014, ICWO won the contract to run the 120-year-old Valankadu crematorium. Praveena, as caretaker of the crematorium faced initial challenges, as some of them even threatened with acid attack. Initially she did not have the support of the local people as they were also perturbed to see a woman handled the affairs of the dead.

Eventually, she managed to win over the people's hearts, courtesy a combination of support from the police and her own hard efforts. Solomon worked untiringly to change the looks of crematorium that looked ugly when she took over its affairs more than two years ago. Now people say it looks like a park.

Solomon's current avatar is unique as it marks the first time a woman is running a burial ground in Tamil Nadu, where—like in most parts of the country—upkeep of crematorium is a male domain traditionally.

References 

Year of birth missing (living people)
Living people
Businesswomen from Tamil Nadu
Businesspeople from Tamil Nadu